Phoxinus is a genus of freshwater fish in the family Leuciscidae of order Cypriniformes, and the only members of the subfamily Phoxininae, or Eurasian minnows. The type species is Phoxinus phoxinus. The other species in this genus are also commonly known as minnows. The name "minnow" was what early English fisherman used to describe "small and insignificant". The genus Phoxinus is found throughout Eurasia, and includes 21 known species. Previously, members of the North American genus Chrosomus were also believed to form part of this genus.

Species
There are currently 22 recognized species in this genus:
 Phoxinus apollonicus Bianco & De Bonis, 2015 <ref name=Bianco2015>Bianco, P.G. & De Bonis, S. (2015): A taxonomic study on the genus Phoxinus (Acthinopterigy, Cyprinidae) from Italy and western Balkans with description of four new species: P. ketmaieri, P. karsticus, P. apollonicus and P. likai. In: Bianco, P.G. & de Filippo, G. (Eds.), Researches on Wildlife Conservation, 4 IGF Publ., USA., . pp. 1–22.</ref>
 Phoxinus bigerri Kottelat, 2007 (Adour minnow)
 Phoxinus brachyurus L. S. Berg, 1912 (Seven River's minnow)
 Phoxinus colchicus L. S. Berg, 1910
 Phoxinus grumi L. S. Berg, 1907
 Phoxinus issykkulensis L. S. Berg, 1912 (Issyk-kul' minnow)
 Phoxinus jouyi (D. S. Jordan & Snyder, 1901)
 Phoxinus karsticus Bianco & De Bonis, 2015 
 Phoxinus keumkang (M. K. Chyung, 1977)
 Phoxinus ketmaieri Bianco & De Bonis, 2015 
 Phoxinus kumgangensis L. T. Kim, 1980
 Phoxinus laevis syn. P. phoxinus below
 Phoxinus likai Bianco & De Bonis, 2015 
 Phoxinus oxyrhynchus (T. Mori, 1930)
 Phoxinus phoxinus (Linnaeus, 1758) (Eurasian minnow)
 Phoxinus semotilus (D. S. Jordan & Starks, 1905)
 Phoxinus septimaniae Kottelat, 2007
 Phoxinus steindachneri Sauvage, 1883
 Phoxinus strandjae Drensky, 1926 (Bulgarian minnow)
 Phoxinus strymonicus Kottelat, 2007 (Aegean minnow)
 Phoxinus tchangi X. Y. Chen, 1988
 Phoxinus ujmonensis Kaschenko, 1899
 Phoxinus lumaireul'' Schinz, 1840

References

 
Taxa named by Constantine Samuel Rafinesque
Freshwater fish genera